Edificio Luis Guevara Arias is a cruiseship shape building. This construction, located between Errázuriz Avenue and Blanco Street in Valparaíso, was the residence of textile tycoon Luis Guevara Arias; it was built between 1881 & 1883 years. It was abandoned for many years, several establishment have was there without luck. In 1994, it was declared a National Monument by the Consejo de Monumentos Nacionales.

At the present, this place is part of DUOC Educational Institute.

References

Buildings and structures in Valparaíso
Neoclassical architecture in Chile